(Z)-9-Tricosene, known as muscalure, is an insect pheromone found in dipteran flies such as the housefly. Females produce it to attract males to mate. It is used as a pesticide, as in Maxforce Quickbayt by Bayer, luring males to traps to prevent them from reproducing.

Biological functions
(Z)-9-Tricosene is a sex pheromone produced by female house flies (Musca domestica) to attract males.  In bees, it is one of the communication pheromones released during the waggle dance.

Uses
As a pesticide, (Z)-9-tricosene is used in fly paper and other traps to lure male flies, trap them, and prevent them from reproducing.

Biosynthesis
(Z)-9-Tricosene is biosynthesized in house flies from nervonic acid.  The acid is converted into the acyl-CoA derivative and then reduced to the aldehyde (Z)-15-tetracosenal.  Through a decarboxylation reaction, the aldehyde is converted to (Z)-9-tricosene.  The process is mediated by a cytochrome P450 enzyme and requires oxygen (O) and nicotinamide adenine dinucleotide phosphate (NADPH).

Safety 
Products containing (Z)-9-tricosene are considered safe for humans, wildlife, and the environment.

References 

Insect pheromones
Pesticides
Alkenes
Hydrocarbons